The 1950 Michigan gubernatorial election was held on November 7, 1950. Incumbent Democrat G. Mennen Williams defeated Republican nominee Harry Kelly with 49.76% of the vote.

General election

Candidates
Major party candidates
G. Mennen Williams, Democratic
Harry Kelly, Republican
Other candidates
Perry Hayden, Prohibition
Theos A. Grove, Socialist Labor
Howard Lerner, Socialist Workers

Results

Primaries 
The primary elections occurred on September 12, 1950.

Democratic primary

Republican primary

References

1950
Michigan
Gubernatorial
November 1950 events in the United States